Matzen-Raggendorf is a municipality in the district of Gänserndorf in the Austrian state of Lower Austria.

Geography
Matzen-Raggendorf lies on the edge of the Weinviertel hills and the Marchfeld in Lower Austria, about 35 km northeast of Vienna.

References

Cities and towns in Gänserndorf District